UEW may refer to:

Union of Environment Workers
United Electrical, Radio and Machine Workers of America
Universal Eclectic Wicca
University of Education, Winneba